The Victorian Championships  its original name until 1968 it was then known as the  Victorian Open Grass Court Championships or Victorian Open was a tennis event held from 1879 through 1971 it was originally played at the Melbourne Cricket Ground Lawn Tennis Club, until 1933 the venue changed to Kooyong Lawn Tennis Club Australia for the remainder of its run.

History
The Victorian Championships tournament began in 1879 it was originally held on hard asphalt courts from 1879 to 1891 before changing to a grass court  tournament. The dates the tournament was held was normally in November. until its move to Kooyong when it was staged during the last week of November and first week of December in 1968 the event schedule changed again to January it survived for a period of 86 years until 1971. The tournament was very briefly re-established in 1982 as the Melbourne Outdoor until 1985.

The first championship was held at the Melbourne Cricket Ground in January 1880. There were 16 entries. A. F. Robinson beat H. M. Strachan in the final by 2 sets to 1, winning the final set 6–5. In November 1880 another championship was held, the "Intercolonial Lawn Tennis Championship". It was held during the horticultural flower show, taking place on the Melbourne Cricket Ground. The event took an unusual form, in that after two rounds, three players remained. Frank Highett was to play R. P. Arnold, the winner playing Edward Wallington in the final. On the final day Wallington was ill and so the match between Highett and Arnold determined the winner. Highett won by 3 sets to 1, Arnold winning the second set. The 1881 championship was played on grass at the Melbourne Cricket Ground. Highett reached the final again but lost to Louis Whyte. The 1882 championship was played on the asphalt courts. Whyte reached the final again and met Arthur Keyser, a member of HMS Nelson. Whyte won the first set, but Keyser took the next three to win the championship. Whyte reached his third successive final in 1883 where he beat Walter Carre Riddell in three straight sets. The scoring system was changed in 1884. There were no sets, the winner being the first to reach 25 games. There were two new finalists, with Harry Brind beating Dudley Webb by 25 games to 15. 1885 saw a repeat of the 1883 final between Riddell and Whyte. Riddell took a 12 games to 1 lead and eventually won by 25 games to 13. 1885 saw a return to set scoring. Riddell retained the title, beating Webb in the final by three sets to one. The championship was preceded by an intercolonial match between Victoria and New South Wales. This was the first such match to be played in Victoria, the previous two having been played in Sydney. The match resulted in an easy win for Victoria, the opponents being unused to the asphalt surface.

Finals
Notes: Challenge round: The final round of a tournament, in which the winner of a single-elimination phase faces the previous year's champion, who plays only that one match. The challenge round was used in the early history of tennis (from 1877 through 1921) in some tournaments not all. * Indicates challenger

Men's singles

Women's singles

Records

Men's singles
Source: The Tennisbase included
Most titles:  Gerald Patterson, (8) 
Most consecutive titles:  Gerald Patterson, (6) 
Most finals:  Jack Crawford, (11) 
Most consecutive finals:  Jack Crawford, (10)
Most matches played:  Jack Crawford, (76)
Most matches won:  Jack Crawford, (64)
Most consecutive match wins:  Gerald Patterson, (33)
Most editions played:  Harry Hopman, (21)
Best match winning %:  Gerald Patterson, (93.62%)
Longest final:  Neale Fraser v  Roy Emerson, result: 6-0, 25-23, 5-7, 6-4 (76 games), (1959)
Shortest final:  Alex Metreveli v  Phil Dent, result: 6-4, 6-2 (18 games), (1971)
Title with the fewest games lost:  Norman Brookes, (19), (1904)
Oldest champion:  Harry Parker, 34y 6m and 19d, (1907)
Youngest champion:  Lew Hoad, 19y 0m and 7d, (1953)

See also
Tennis in Australia

Notes

References
 Ayre's Lawn Tennis Almanack And Tournament Guide, A. Wallis Myers
 Dunlop Lawn Tennis Almanack And Tournament Guide, G.P. Hughes, 1939 to 1958, Published by Dunlop Sports Co. Ltd, UK
 Lowe's Lawn Tennis Annuals and Compendia, Lowe, Sir F. Gordon, Eyre & Spottiswoode

Grass court tennis tournaments
Defunct tennis tournaments in Australia